Lawler is an Irish surname. It is an Anglicized form of Gaelic Ó Leathlobhair. Notable people with the surname include:

Anderson Lawler (1902–1959), American actor
Brian Lawler (1972–2018), American wrestler known as Brian Christopher
Chris Lawler (born 1943), British footballer
Fergal Lawler, Irish drummer
Frank Lawler (1842–1896), American politician
Geoffrey Lawler (born 1954), British politician
George Lawler (born 1995), English rugby league footballer
Greg Lawler (born 1955), American mathematician
Jerry Lawler (born 1949), American wrestler and color commentator
John Jeremiah Lawler (1862–1948), American bishop
John Paul Lawler (born 1979), real name of Scottish musician Jon Fratelli
Justin Lawler (born 1994), American football player
Kate Lawler (born 1980), English model and DJ
Kenny Lawler (born 1994), American football player
Louise Lawler (born 1947), American artist
Michael K. Lawler (1814–1882), Irish-American army general
Peter Lawler (disambiguation), numerous people
Ralph Lawler (born 1938), American television and radio personality
Ray Lawler (born 1921), Australian playwright and actor
Robbie Lawler (born 1982), American mixed martial artist
Rod Lawler (born 1971), English snooker player
Sean P. Lawler (born 1976), American Morale Patch entrepreneur at tacgent.com
Steve Lawler (DJ) (born 1973), British electronic musician
Steve Lawler (wrestler) (1965–2021), American professional wrestler
Sylvia Lawler (1922–1996), English geneticist
Tony Lawler (born 1961), Australian politician
Traugott Lawler (born 1937), American historian

See also
Jordan Lawlar (born 2002), American baseball player
Ernest Lawlars (1900–1961), American blues musician known as Little Son Joe
Lawyer (surname)

References 

English-language surnames
Surnames of Irish origin
Anglicised Irish-language surnames